Egyptian bean is a common name for several plants and may refer to:

 Lablab purpureus
 Nelumbo nucifera